Brazen Hussies is a 2020 Australian documentary recording the history of the Women's Liberation Movement in Australia from 1965 to 1975.

Following screenings at both the Brisbane International Film Festival and the Adelaide Film Festival, Brazen Hussies was released publicly on 7 November 2020.

Brazen Hussies was nominated for the best documentary award at the 10th AACTA Awards.

It is Catherine Dwyer's first film as director and Sue Maslin was executive producer.

In a review in The Guardian, Kath Kenny wrote: "Dwyer has uncovered terrific archival footage and photos to complement contemporary interviews". Sally Breen, a senior lecturer at Griffith University, writing for The Conversation, says that the film is: "A celebration of how far we’ve come and a warning of just how easily everything these women fought for could be lost."

References

External links 
 
 
Interview with director, Catherine Dwyer on ABC Radio Perth

2020 films
Australian documentary films
2020 documentary films